Vyacheslav Vyacheslavovich Gordanov (1902–1983) was a Soviet and Russian cinematographer. He worked on the 1949 film Ivan Pavlov.

Selected filmography
   Lenin Address (1929)
   Thunderstorm (1933)
 Peter the Great (1937-1938)
 Masquerade (1941)
A Mitten (1942)
 In the Name of Life (1946)
 Ivan Pavlov (1949)

References

Bibliography 
 Beumers, Birgit. Directory of World Cinema: Russia. Intellect Books, 2011.

External links 
 

1902 births
1983 deaths
People from Polotsk
Stalin Prize winners
Recipients of the Order of the Red Banner of Labour
Russian cinematographers
Soviet cinematographers